Blagoy (Bulgarian: Благой) is a Bulgarian masculine given name and may refer to:

Blagoy Blagoev (born 1956), Olympic weightlifter for Bulgaria
Blagoy Georgiev (born 1981), Bulgarian footballer
Blagoy Makendzhiev (born 1988), Bulgarian footballer
Blagoy Nakov (born 1985), Bulgarian footballer
Blagoy Paskov (born 1991), Bulgarian footballer
Blagoy Popov (1902–1968), co-defendant along with Georgi Dimitrov and Vasil Tanev in the Leipzig trial
Blagoy Shklifov, Bulgarian dialectologist and phonologist
Blagoy Ivanov, Bulgarian mixed martial artist

See also
Blagoje
Blagoj

Bulgarian masculine given names
Slavic masculine given names